B&G, formerly known as Brookes and Gatehouse, is a developer and manufacturer of advanced instrumentation, autopilot and navigation systems for racing and cruising sailing yachts.

Its equipment can be found on many of the world's leading sail racing yachts, including the majority of competitors for events such as the America's Cup, Vendee Globe and the Volvo Ocean Race.

History 
The company was founded in 1956 by Major R.N. Gatehouse and Ronald Brookes who had formed a partnership the previous year to develop and manufacture a new radio direction finder (RDF) for use by private sailing boats. In 1956 the 'Homer' receiver was produced, said to be the first transistorised RDF to be made available to the world's leisure marine market.

Over the course of the 1950s, B&G, then based in Lymington on the south coast of England, extended its activities into echo sounders and in 1960 produced its first speedometer. In 1966 the ketch Gypsy Moth IV, the yacht which earned Sir Francis Chichester his single-handed circumnavigation record, was equipped with a full suite of B&G instruments.

In the 1970s and 1980s the company continued to rapidly innovate, receiving in 1981 a Design Council Award for its Hercules electronic data system, which effectively introduced computers to leisure boating, and continues to do so to this day, remaining the market leader in advanced instrumentation systems for grand prix racing yachts and sailing superyachts, as well as for club racers and blue water cruising yachts.

The company has changed hands a number of times during its lifetime, and is now a brand of Navico, the Norwegian-based leader in the marine electronics sector. B&G however remains headquartered just a few miles from its birthplace, in Hampshire, UK.

Products 
B&G is primarily known for producing integrated sailing instrumentation systems that collect and analyse a wide range of data relating both to a yacht's performance and the external conditions in which it is sailing. This information can then be displayed to the helmsman, navigator and crew and/or analysed by integral data processing functions to produce additional information flows that enable the yacht's crew to make informed decisions with regard to performance optimisation, navigation strategy, safety and tactics.

Data that is collected may include apparent wind speed, apparent wind angle, boat speed, heading, position (Latitude/Longitude) and depth. By combining and analysing these inputs a B&G system can calculate and display in real time information such as true wind speed, true wind direction, course over ground, Velocity made good, time and distance to next waypoint, and much more. This data can additionally be fed into tactical navigation software such as B&G's proprietary Deckman system and analysed against tidal and current databases, electronic charting and weather prediction feeds to enable the navigator to devise the fastest and most efficient route between two or more points. This information can also be fed into autopilot systems.

Alongside instrumentation, B&G also designs and manufactures autopilots for sailing yachts. Their autopilots have been used by many short-handed racers, including Dame Ellen MacArthur (during her single-handed circumnavigation race on Kingfisher in the 2000-01 Vendée Globe and her outright single-handed circumnavigation record on Castorama/B&Q), François Gabart (winner of the 2012 Vendée Globe on the IMOCA 60 Macif), Armel Le Cléac'h (1st Vendée Globe 2016, 2nd  Vendée Globe 2012 - IMOCA 60, Banque Populaire) and Alex Thomson (2nd Vendée Globe 2016, 3rd Vendée Globe 2012 - IMOCA 60, Hugo Boss).

From 2010 onwards B&G also re-entered the navigation market with their Zeus range of multi-function displays alongside the first recreational FMCW "Broadband" Radar. The unique feature of the B&G navigation devices was their inclusion of unique sailing features including the patented SailSteer composite gauge, SailingTime - providing realistic time-to-waypoint features for sailing yachts - Laylines, Start Line function for racing and WindPlot for tracking of wind strength and direction trends.

Product categories developed and marketed by B&G include:

 Sailing Instruments and sensors
Autopilots
 Navigation (Chartplotters / Multi-Function Displays)

 Radar
 Communications (VHF)
Products include:
 Hydra 330/2/2000 Instruments
Helmstar autopilot
 Hercules 190/290/390 Instruments
Hercules 690/790/2000 Instruments and Pilots
 Network Instruments and Pilots
H1000 Instruments and Pilots
 H3000 Instruments and Pilots
H5000 Instruments and Pilots
 WTP, WTP2, WTP3 Grand Prix instrument systems
608, 213, WS300, WS700 wind sensors
 Deckman Tactical Navigation software
 Zeus, Zeus Touch, Zeus 2, Zeus 3 of multi-function navigation systems
Vulcan FS chartplotters
 Triton (T41), Triton 2 Instruments and Pilots
Broadband Radar (FMCW)
HALO Radar (Pulse Compression)
 V20, V50, V60, V90, V100 VHF radios

See also 
 Navico, parent company of B&G
 Simrad Yachting, another Navico brand
 Lowrance Electronics, another Navico brand
C-MAP, another Navico brand

References 

http://www.bandg.com/
http://www.navico.com/

External links 

Electronics companies established in 1956
Navigation system companies
1956 establishments in England
Companies based in Hampshire
Navigational equipment manufacturers
Marine electronics
Manufacturing companies of the United Kingdom
British brands